Napoleón Calzado (born February 9, 1977 in Santo Domingo, Dominican Republic) is a former Major League Baseball player for the Baltimore Orioles. He won the bronze medal in the 2000 Pan American Championship where this national team qualified for the 2001 Baseball World Cup.

Calzado played for the Orioles in the  season. In four games, he had one hit in five at bats, playing the outfield. He batted and threw right-handed. In December 2008, Calzado and 8 teammates on the dMedia T-Rex were accused of throwing games from the Chinese Professional Baseball League. On June 26, 2009, Calzado signed with the Long Beach Armada, Golden Baseball League in Long Beach, California. He played with the national team in the 2010 Central American and Caribbean Games played in Mayagüez, Puerto Rico, winning the tournament's gold medal. During this tournament, Calzado was scouted and later signed by the Nicaraguan team Indios del Bóer to play the 2010–11 Nicaraguan Professional Baseball League season, helping his team to win the championship.

References

External links
Baseball Reference.com page
Long Beach Armada website

1977 births
Living people
Aberdeen IronBirds players
Baltimore Orioles players
Bluefield Orioles players
Bowie Baysox players
Brockton Rox players
Central American and Caribbean Games gold medalists for the Dominican Republic
Delmarva Shorebirds players
Dominican Republic expatriate baseball players in Canada
Dominican Republic expatriate baseball players in the United States
Frederick Keys players
Greenville Braves players
Gulf Coast Orioles players

Long Beach Armada players
Major League Baseball outfielders
Major League Baseball players from the Dominican Republic
New Jersey Jackals players
Ottawa Lynx players
Pensacola Pelicans players
Richmond Braves players
Sportspeople from Santo Domingo
Competitors at the 2010 Central American and Caribbean Games
Central American and Caribbean Games medalists in baseball
Azucareros del Este players
Dmedia T-REX players 
Dominican Republic expatriate baseball players in Taiwan
Olmecas de Tabasco players
Dominican Republic expatriate baseball players in Mexico
Tigres del Licey players
Dominican Republic expatriate baseball players in Nicaragua